The 1978 Rose Bowl was a college football bowl game, played on Monday, January 2, and was the 64th Rose Bowl Game. The Washington Huskies, champions of the Pacific-8 Conference, defeated the favored Michigan Wolverines, champions of the Big Ten Conference,  Washington quarterback Warren Moon was named the Rose Bowl Player of the Game.

The Huskies led  at the half and extended it to  early in the third quarter, then held off a Wolverine comeback with two interceptions deep in their own territory in the last two minutes to win by seven. It was the second of three consecutive losses in the Rose Bowl for Michigan, a two-touchdown favorite entering this game.

The face value of game tickets was $17.50 each.

Teams

Michigan Wolverines
Led by junior quarterback Rick Leach, Michigan began the season ranked second, and were first after four of the first six weeks. However, a stunning  loss on October 22 at Minnesota dropped them to sixth. A  win over fourth-ranked rival Ohio State gave the Wolverines the Big Ten title and they came into the Rose Bowl ranked fourth.

Washington Huskies
In their third season under head coach Don James and quarterback Warren Moon, Washington stumbled out of the gate, losing three of their first four games, all out of conference. They then won six of seven, losing  at UCLA on October 29 (later vacated by the Bruins, due to ineligible players). The Huskies won the Pac-8 title and earned the Rose Bowl berth when UCLA lost its final game on a last second field goal to USC,  Washington entered the game ranked thirteenth in the AP poll, and tied for fourteenth in the UPI coaches poll.

Scoring

First quarter
 Washington – Warren Moon 2-yard run (Steve Robbins kick); UW 7–0

Second quarter
 Washington – Robbins 30-yard field goal; UW 10–0
 Washington – Moon 1-yard run (Robbins kick); UW 17–0

Third quarter
 Washington – Spider Gaines 28-yard pass from Moon (Robbins kick); UW 24–0
 Michigan – Curt Stephenson 76-yard pass from Rick Leach (Gregg Willner kick); UW 24–7
 Washington – Robbins 18-yard field goal; UW 27–7

Fourth quarter
 Michigan – Russell Davis 2-yard run (Willner kick); UW 27–14
 Michigan – Stan Edwards 32-yard pass from Leach (kick failed); UW 27–20

Statistics
{| class=wikitable style="text-align:center"
! Statistics !! Washington!!   Michigan  
|-
| align=left|First downs || 17 || 22
|-
| align=left|Rushes–yards|| 48–164 || 48–149
|-
| align=left|Passing yards || 234 || 239
|-
| align=left|Passes || 13–24–2 || 14–27–2
|-
| align=left|Total yards || 398 || 388
|-
| align=left|Punts–average || 5–39 || 4–43
|-
| align=left|Fumbles–lost ||0–0|| 2–1
|-
| align=left|Turnovers by|| 2|| 3
|-
| align=left|Penalties–yards ||6–47|| 3–11
|}

Aftermath
With Notre Dame beating top-ranked and undefeated Texas in the Cotton Bowl, Michigan had hopes that a dominant win over Washington would boost the Wolverines to the national title. The Huskies' dramatic upset ended those hopes, and Notre Dame was voted first in the polls among five one-loss teams; Alabama, Arkansas, Texas, and Penn State were the others.  Michigan dropped to ninth in the final AP poll and Washington climbed to tenth; both were a spot higher in the UPI coaches poll.

References

External links
 Summary at Bentley Historical Library, University of Michigan Athletics History

Rose Bowl
Rose Bowl Game
Michigan Wolverines football bowl games
Washington Huskies football bowl games
Rose Bowl
January 1978 sports events in the United States